Tungsten is a chemical element with symbol W and atomic number 74.

Tungsten may also refer to:

Tungsten (band), Swedish heavy metal band
Tungsten (music), a type of phonograph pickup stylus
Tungsten (film), 2011 Greek film
Tungsten, Colorado, a ghost town
Tungsten, Northwest Territories, a Canadian townsite
Tungsten (Cantung) Airport, a Canadian private airport
Palm Tungsten, Palm Inc.'s product line of personal digital assistants
Operation Tungsten, World War II UK Royal Navy operation to sink the German battleship Tirpitz
Tungsten, a character from the novel Blart: The Boy Who Didn't Want to Save the World
Tungsten, a setting for color temperature on digital cameras
Tungsten Network, a global electronic invoicing firm
Nexus Q, a digital media player first demoed as Project Tungsten

See also

 Wolfram (disambiguation)
 W (disambiguation)
 Isotopes of tungsten